ORP Huragan may refer to:
 The planned ORP Huragan and ORP Orkan, or Improved Grom-class destroyers
 

Polish Navy ship names